Vernon Bradford Romney (April 27, 1924 – July 13, 2013) was an American lawyer who served as the attorney general of Utah from 1969 to 1977, and the Republican candidate for Governor of Utah in 1976. He was a member of the Romney family and the Church of Jesus Christ of Latter-day Saints.

Early life, military, and education
Romney was born to Vernon Romney (1896–1976) and Anna Lois Bradford (1900–1957) in Salt Lake City, Utah, the oldest of eight children. His father was an attorney and the chair of the Utah Republican party in 1944–50 and 1958–62. He is a first cousin of George W. Romney and a first cousin once removed to Mitt Romney. Romney graduated in 1941 from East High School.

Romney served in Okinawa and Leyte during World War II as an infantryman in the 96th Infantry Division as a radio operator and an assistant to a Methodist chaplain. He graduated with a BS in political science from the University of Utah and with a JD from George Washington University in 1953.

Legal and political career
Romney worked as an attorney for the Federal Communications Commission and on the staff of Senator Arthur V. Watkins, both while in Washington, DC.  He practiced law in Salt Lake City for fifteen years with the firms Romney and Nelson, and later Romney, Madsen, and Cummings.  From 1955-1959 he was an Assistant Attorney General for the State of Utah.  He was elected Attorney General of Utah in 1968, and was reelected to this position in 1972.  He appeared before the U.S. Supreme Court in a case to obtain the mineral rights in the Great Salt Lake for the State of Utah, helped to improve airline service to the Salt Lake International Airport, increased consumer protection in the state of Utah, and was involved in efforts to reform federal habeas corpus laws.    After a failed bid for Governor of Utah in 1976, Romney was the Highland, Utah City Attorney from 1977 to 1992.

Church service
Romney served a mission for the Church of Jesus Christ of Latter-day Saints (LDS Church) to Buffalo and Niagara Falls, New York from 1948 to 1950. He later served missions with his wife Pat to Charleston, West Virginia, from 1997 to 1998, and La Jolla, California, from 2001 to 2002.

Family
Romney married Patricia (Pat) Pingree on December 29, 1951. In 1986, Pat was called as the national president of Lambda Delta Sigma, the LDS Church-sponsored sorority for college-age women. They are the parents to six children. They also have twenty-one grandchildren and, at the time of Romney's death, eleven great-grandchildren.

References

1924 births
2013 deaths
Latter Day Saints from Utah
United States Army personnel of World War II
Candidates in the 1976 United States elections
20th-century American politicians
Romney family
George Washington University Law School alumni
University of Utah alumni
Politicians from Salt Lake City
Utah Attorneys General
Lawyers from Salt Lake City
Utah Republicans
American Mormon missionaries in the United States
20th-century Mormon missionaries
21st-century Mormon missionaries